Kacy Rodgers II (born April 2, 1992) is an American football strong safety who is currently a free agent. He played college football at the University of Miami (2010-2013) where he received his Bachelor's degree in Economics. Kacy is currently enrolled in the MBA program at Southern Methodist University. His father Kacy Rodgers is currently the defensive line coach of the Tampa Bay Buccaneers.

Professional career
In May 2014, Rodgers attended rookie minicamp on a tryout basis with the Kansas City Chiefs, but was not signed.

Edmonton Eskimos
In June 2015, he signed with the Edmonton Eskimos of the Canadian Football League (CFL). On June 21, 2015, Rodgers was released by the team following the final roster cuts deadline. He was signed to the team's practice roster on July 12, 2015.

Saskatchewan Roughriders
On August 9, 2016, Rodgers signed with the Saskatchewan Roughriders of the CFL.

New York Jets
On February 8, 2018, Rodgers signed with the New York Jets of the NFL, joining his father Kacy Rodgers, who is the defensive coordinator of the Jets. He was waived on August 31, 2018.

References

External links

Miami Hurricanes bio
Saskatchewan Roughriders bio

1992 births
Living people
American football defensive backs
American players of Canadian football
Canadian football defensive backs
Edmonton Elks players
Miami Hurricanes football players
New York Jets players
People from Southlake, Texas
Players of American football from Texas
Saskatchewan Roughriders players
Sportspeople from the Dallas–Fort Worth metroplex